Zarb-i-Kalim (or The Rod of Moses) is a philosophical poetry book of Allama Iqbal in Urdu, a poet-philosopher of the Indian subcontinent. It was published in 1936, two years before his death.

Introduction
This is third collection of Allama Sir Muhammad Iqbal's poetry, which described as his political manifesto. It was published with the subtitle "A Declaration of War Against the Present Times." Muhammad Iqbal who also known as "Poet of the East" argues that modern problems are due to the godlessness, materialism and injustice of modern civilisation, which feeds on the subjugation and exploitation of weak nations, especially the Indian Muslims.

Editions
Its first edition published in 1935 i.e. just three years before death of Allama Muhammad Iqbal, after that various editions published from Pakistan and India but most authentic edition is of Iqbal Academy Pakistan which published in 2002 from Lahore.

See also 
 Index of Muhammad Iqbal–related articles
 Javid Nama
 Payam-i-Mashriq
 Zabur-i-Ajam
 Pas Chih Bayad Kard ay Aqwam-i-Sharq
 Bang-e-Dara
 Bal-e-Jibril
 Asrar-i-Khudi
 Armaghan-i-Hijaz
 Rumuz-e-Bekhudi

References

External links
Read Online at Iqbal Academy site
Read Online at Iqbal cyber library
Read English translation by Syed Akbar Ali Shah at Iqbal Academy site

1936 poetry books
Islamic philosophical poetry books
Poetry by Muhammad Iqbal
Poetry collections
Books by Muhammad Iqbal